Kentucky Route 79 (KY 79) is a  north–south state highway that traverses five counties in west-central Kentucky. It can be seen as an extension of U.S. Route 79 (US 79), as they have the same number and once intersected; KY 79 begins in the same city that US 79 ends, and both travel on a northeast–southwest diagonal.

Route description
KY 79 starts at an intersection with KY 3519, an old alignment of US 431, Main Street in downtown Russellville, while US 79's end is currently at an intersection with US 68 and KY 80 on the eastern side of Russellville. KY 79 has an intersection with the new US 68/KY 80 alignment. The two routes once met at the intersection of Main Street and Ninth Street, which carried the US 79 route to US 68 before the bypass.

KY 79 traverses northwestern Logan County. It passes through mainly rural areas northeast of Russellville, and then enters Butler County. KY 79 has intersections with KY 626 and KY 1153. It then joins US 231 just south of Morgantown. US 231 and KY 79 together go into downtown Morgantown after their interchange with I-165, the former William H. Natcher Parkway, and then meets KY 403 in downtown, and then KY 70 on the north side. KY 70 joins KY 79 and US 231 and all three routes are carried over the Green River to Aberdeen.

KY 79 departs at the Aberdeen Grocery, but KY 70 does not break up until reaching an intersection one mile north on US 231. After the split from US 231 and KY 70, KY 79 has an intersection with KY 1328 not more than 1/4 of a mile from the split from US 231. Kentucky Route 79 crosses KY 70 for a final time, and becomes known as Caneyville Road.

KY 79 passes through Butler County's northern communities of Welcome and Welch's Creek where it meets up with KY 340. KY 79 enters Grayson County and has access to the Wendell H. Ford Western Kentucky Parkway on the south side of Caneyville and would also intersect KY 185, and immediately after that, US 62 in downtown Caneyville.

KY 79 then goes north to Pine Knob and Short Creek, where it intersects KY 54 at Short Creek, goes through the developed portion of Falls of Rough, and then passes the Rough River Dam State Park, and crosses into Breckinridge County where it intersects with KY 105, and then meets up with KY 259.

KY 79 joins KY 259 from the lake area until they both reach the intersection with U.S. Highway 60 at Harned, southeast of Hardinsburg. While KY 259 makes a left turn to join US 60 westbound, KY 79 turns onto eastbound US 60, and stays with US 60 until reaching Irvington, where KY 79 enters Meade County, and heads for Brandenburg. On the southwest side of Brandenburg, KY 79 ends at an intersection with KY 313 and KY 448. The route once went to the nearby Ohio River bridge, but that was superseded with the completion of KY 313, the Joe Prather Highway, through Meade County.

History
For a time prior to 1942, KY 79 was originally assigned to a rural highway in Simpson County. That route ran from the Tennessee state line, continuing south as Tennessee State Route 49, northeastward to Franklin; this route later became Kentucky Route 383.

From the 1940s until 1958, KY 79 only existed on its course from Irvington to Brandenburg; the current alignment of KY 79 from Russellville to Axtel was signed as KY 105. With the 1958 extension of U.S. Route 79 into Kentucky from Clarksville, Tennessee, KY 79 was extended to its current length to serve as an unofficial extension of US 79.

In Meade County, KY 79 previously ran around the west side of Brandenburg to the Matthew E. Welsh Bridge across the Ohio River, where it terminated on the Indiana state line to become Indiana State Road 135. However, in 2018, the designation was replaced by KY 313, truncating KY 79 to its current terminus.

Major intersections

Special routes

Kentucky Route 79 Truck 

Kentucky Route 79 Truck (KY 79 Truck) is a truck route in Morgantown, Kentucky. It runs concurrently with the entire route of US 231 Truck as the main KY 79 alignment runs concurrently with US 231's main alignment throughout the city. It serves as a by-pass route around Morgantown. Its component routes include I-165 from the Main Street interchange to the KY 70 interchange, and KY 70 (Veterans Way) from the I-165 junction to the US 231/KY 79/KY 403 junction on the north side of town.

References

External links
KY 79 at Kentucky Roads

 
0079
0079
0079
0079
0079
0079